Ephraim George Squier (June 17, 1821 – April 17, 1888), usually cited as E. G. Squier, was an American archaeologist, history writer, painter and newspaper editor.

Biography

Squier was born in Bethlehem, New York, the son of a minister, Joel Squier, and his wife, Catharine Squier, née Kilmer or Külmer. His father was of English descent and his mother ethnic Palatine German, from immigrants who settled in New York in the early 1700s. In early youth he worked on a farm, attended and taught school, studied engineering, and became interested in American antiquities. The Panic of 1837 made an engineering career unfeasible, so he pursued literature and journalism. He was associated in the publication of the New York State Mechanic at Albany 1841–1842. In 1843–1848, he engaged in journalism in Hartford, Connecticut and then edited the Chillicothe, Ohio, weekly newspaper the Scioto Gazette.

During this period, Squier collaborated with physician Edwin H. Davis on the book, Ancient Monuments of the Mississippi Valley, which was issued in 1848. The work was a landmark in American scientific research, the study of the prehistoric Mound Builders of North America, and the early development of archaeology as a scientific discipline. The book was the first volume of the Smithsonian Institution's Contributions to Knowledge series and the Institution's first publication. Among Squier and Davis's most important achievements was their systematic approach to analyzing and documenting the sites they surveyed, including the Serpent Mound in Peebles, Ohio, which they discovered in 1846. They also mapped the Mound City Group in Chillicothe, Ohio, which has been restored using their data and is now part of Hopewell Culture National Historical Park. Squier and Davis's collection of ancient Mound objects is now kept at the British Museum.

Squier was appointed special chargé d'affaires to all the Central American states in 1849, and negotiated treaties with Nicaragua, Honduras, and San Salvador. In 1853 he made a second visit to Central America to examine a line for a projected interoceanic railroad, and to make further study of the archaeology of the country. In 1856 he received the medal of the French Geographical Society for his researches. In 1858, he married Miriam Florence Folline, who had recently had a previous marriage annulled.

About 1860, Squier became editor-in-chief for Frank Leslie's publishing house. He supervised the publication of the first two volumes of Frank Leslie's Pictorial History of the American Civil War. In 1863 Squier was appointed as U. S. commissioner to Peru, where he made an exhaustive investigation of Inca remains and took numerous photographs of them. He later gave a series of 12 lectures on "The Inca Empire" for the Lowell Institute for their 1866–67 season. 

In 1868 he was appointed consul-general of Honduras at New York, and in 1871 he was elected as the first president of the Anthropological Institute of New York. He conducted ethnological studies, especially in Nicaragua, Honduras and Peru.

On returning from Peru, he continued working for Frank Leslie, but gave it up when his health failed. In 1873, his wife divorced him, and married Leslie a year later. In 1874 Squier's health became so seriously impaired as to preclude further original research. Though he subsequently recovered sufficiently to direct the final preparation and revision of his work on Peru for publication, the affliction resulted in his death. He was a member of numerous historical, archaeological, and scientific societies. He died in Brooklyn, New York.

Works
Besides many official reports, scientific papers, magazine articles, and contributions to the Encyclopædia Britannica and foreign periodicals, his works include:
 Ancient Monuments of the Mississippi Valley ("Smithsonian Contributions to Knowledge", vol. 1, 1848)
 Aboriginal Monuments of the State of New York ("Smithsonian Contributions to Knowledge", vol. 2, 1849; Buffalo, 1851)
 Serpent Symbols (1852)
 Nicaragua: its People, Scenery, Monuments, and the Proposed Interoceanic Canal (2 vols., New York, 1852)
 Notes on Central America (1854)
 Waikna, or Adventures on the Mosquito Shore (1855)
 The States of Central America (1857; revised ed., 1870)
 Monographs of Authors who have written on the Aboriginal Languages of Central America (1860)
 Tropical Fibres and their Economic Extraction (1861)
 Peru: Incidents and Explorations in the Land of the Incas (1877)

Notes

References

External links

 
 
 

1821 births
1888 deaths
American archaeologists
Incan scholars
American Mesoamericanists
Mesoamerican archaeologists
19th-century American newspaper editors
19th-century Mesoamericanists
People from Bethlehem, New York
American male journalists
19th-century American male writers